Two ships of the British Royal Navy have been named HMS Mansfield after Captain Charles Mansfield who commanded HMS Minotaur at the Battle of Trafalgar:

 , a  launched in 1914, sold for breaking up in 1921.

Royal Navy ship names